Kamala Satthianadhan (1880–1950) was an Indian writer, feminist, and editor. She established and edited the Indian Ladies' Magazine, a popular local publication that was in circulation between 1901 and 1938.

Life 
Kamala Satthianadhan was born as Hannah Ratnam Krishnamma, in 1880. She was home-schooled, and later attended Noble College, graduating with a B.A. in 1898, after studying Sanskrit and Indian literature.

In 1898 after graduating, she was married to Samuel Satthianadhan, a professor at Noble College, and a widower whose first wife, the writer Krupabai, died in 1893. Following custom, she changed her name to Kamala Satthianadhan. They had several children, and their daughter, Padmini Satthianadhan Sengupta, became a writer as well, whose memoir of her mother, Portrait of an Indian Woman (1965) is one of the primary sources of information on Satthianadhan's life.

Samuel Satthianadhan died in 1906, and Kamala Satthianadhan supported her family by tutoring a local Rani (queen) in Sanskrit. In 1918, she travelled with her children to the United Kingdom, to provide them with higher education there, returning in 1923. She died in 1950.

Career and writing 
Satthianadhan established the Indian Ladies' Magazine in 1901 with the intention of recording and writing about reforms relating to women's rights. The magazine soon gained popularity, being in local circulation until 1915, when she left for the United Kingdom to provide her children with a graduate education. Although during this period, her sister, S. G. Hensman, was to continue as editor, the magazine ceased active circulation. On her return to India, Satthianadhan became active in the Indian independence movement, and re-started the magazine in 1927, this time with a greater focus on politics, and continued to run it until it stopped circulation in 1938. Contributors to the magazine included political activist and poet Sarojini Naidu, writer and educator Begum Rokeya, lawyer and writer Cornelia Sorabji, politician and Theosophist Annie Besant, feminist and educator Pandita Ramabai, and Satthianadhan's niece, missionary and teacher Mona Hensman.

Before and after her temporary stay in the United Kingdom, Satthianadhan was active in women's groups and social service organisations, establishing nine co-operative societies for women in Andhra Pradesh and the Madras Presidency, to help women gain financial independence. She also established a center in Tirunelveli aimed at providing care for pregnant women and children, worked with the Red Cross and YMCA, and supported anti-discrimination measures aimed at the caste hierarchy. Satthianandhan was also a member of the senates of Andhra University and Madras University.

In 1898, along with her husband Samuel, she published a collection of stories titled Stories of Indian Christian Life, each of them contributing six stories, chiefly consisting of religious parables. She also published several stories and critical essays on literature and politics in the Indian Ladies' Magazine, along with regular editorial features supporting early feminist movements in India. Her daughter's biography indicates that during her life, Satthianadhan published three novels, including one titled Detective Janaki about a young female detective, but these are no longer in publication.

References

Sources

Further reading 
 Padmini Sengupta, Portrait of an Indian Woman (YMCA Publishing House, 1965)

1880 births
1950 deaths
Indian writers
20th-century Indian writers
20th-century Indian women writers
Indian feminists
Indian feminist writers
Writers in British India